Government Engineering College, Siwan (GEC Siwan) is a technical institute in Siwan, India. It is popularly known as Siwan Engineering College. It is approved by AICTE and is affiliated with Aryabhatta Knowledge University. The college is managed by Department of Science and Technology, Bihar.

Courses 
The institute offers full-time Bachelor of Technology (B.Tech) degree programs in following disciples.

 Electrical Engineering 
 Mechanical Engineering 
 Civil Engineering.

History 
It was established in 2018 by the Government of Bihar under the Department of Science and Technology, Bihar.

Its first academic session (2018–19) was held at a temporary campus on the campus of Government Polytechnic College, Siwan.

Departments 
GEC Siwan offers undergraduate courses in:

Admission 
Until 2018, the Bihar Combined Entrance Competitive Examination Board (BCECEB) conducted an exam based on the Merit List of the Bihar Combined Entrance Competitive Examination.  Successful candidates attended an online counseling procedure.

From 2019 onward, admissions in state engineering colleges of Bihar were based on applicant's JEE mains rank. Students have to fill the application form on the BCECE Board website for admission.

Campus  
GEC Siwan Temporary campus is located at Loknayak Jai Prakash Institute of Technology Campus, Chapra, Bihar – 841301. A permanent campus is to be built by 2020.

College facilities 

 College Library
 Different clubs for student
 Computer LAB
 Anti-ragging committee

See also

References

External links 
Official website of Government engineering College, Siwan
Aryabhatta Knowledge University

Engineering colleges in Bihar
Colleges affiliated to Aryabhatta Knowledge University
2018 establishments in Bihar
Educational institutions established in 2018